Ron or Ronald Cox may refer to:

 Ron Cox (American football) (born 1968), former American football linebacker
 Ronny Cox (born 1938), American actor and singer-songwriter